Franz Schubert's compositions of 1822 are mostly in the Deutsch catalogue (D) range D 733–767, and include:
 Instrumental works:
 Symphony No. 8, D 759, a.k.a. Unfinished Symphony
 Wanderer Fantasy, D 760
 Three Marches militaires, D 733
 Vocal music:
 "Willkommen und Abschied", D 767

Table

Legend

List

|-
| 733
| 733
| data-sort-value="051,1826-0" | 51(1826)
| data-sort-value="0901,003" | IX, 1No. 3
| data-sort-value="714,02" | VII/1, 4
| data-sort-value="Marches militaires, 3" | Trois Marches militaires
| data-sort-value="key D major" | D majorG majorE major
| data-sort-value="1818-06-21" | Summer–Autumn1818?
| For piano duet
|-
| 734
| 734
| data-sort-value="067,1826-0" | 67(1826)
| data-sort-value="1200,005" | XIINo. 5
| data-sort-value="727,a0" | VII/2, 7a
| data-sort-value="Landler, 16" | 16 Ländler and 2 Écossaises, a.k.a. Wiener Damen-Ländler
| data-sort-value="key I" | Various keys
| data-sort-value="1826-12-15" | before15/12/1826
| For piano
|-
| 735
| 735
| data-sort-value="049,1825-0" | 49(1825)
| data-sort-value="1200,023" | XIINo. 23
| data-sort-value="727,a0" | VII/2, 7a
| data-sort-value="Galop and Ecossaises" | Galop and Eight Écossaises
| data-sort-value="key I" | Various keys
| data-sort-value="1825-11-21" | before21/11/1825
| For piano
|-
| 736
| 736
| data-sort-value="XXX,1842" | (1842)
| data-sort-value="2007,402" | XX, 7No. 402
| data-sort-value="413,00" | IV, 13
| Ihr Grab
| data-sort-value="text Dort ist ihr Grab" | Dort ist ihr Grab
| data-sort-value="1822-01-01" | 1822?
| data-sort-value="Text by Engelhardt, Karl August, Dort ist ihr Grab" | Text by 
|-
| 737
| 737
| data-sort-value="056,1826-2" | 56,2(1826)
| data-sort-value="2007,414" | XX, 7No. 414
| data-sort-value="403,00" | IV, 3
| An die Leier
| data-sort-value="text Ich will von Atreus Sohnen" | Ich will von Atreus Söhnen
| data-sort-value="1822-01-01" | 1822 or1823?
| data-sort-value="Text by Bruchmann, Franz von translating Anacreon, Ich will von Atreus Sohnen"| Text by  translating Anacreon
|-
| 738
| 738
| data-sort-value="056,1826-3" | 56,3(1826)
| data-sort-value="2007,415" | XX, 7No. 415
| data-sort-value="403,00" | IV, 3
| Im Haine
| data-sort-value="text Sonnenstrahlen durch die Tannen" | Sonnenstrahlen durch die Tannen
| data-sort-value="1822-01-01" | 1822 or1823?
| data-sort-value="Text by Bruchmann, Franz von, Sonnenstrahlen durch die Tannen"| Text by 
|-
| 739
| 739
| data-sort-value="045,1825-0" | 45(1825)
| data-sort-value="1400,006" | XIV No. 6
| data-sort-value="109,005" | I, 9No. 5
| Tantum ergo, D 739
| data-sort-value="key C major" | C major
| data-sort-value="1814-01-01" | 1814
| data-sort-value="Text by Aquinas, Thomas, Tantum ergo 4" | Text by Aquinas (other settings: , 461, 730, 750, 962 and Anh. I/17); For SATB and orchestra
|-
| 740
| 740
| data-sort-value="016,1823-1" | 16,1(1823)
| data-sort-value="1600,007" | XVINo. 7
| data-sort-value="303,28" | III, 3 No. 28Anh. III No. 3Anh. IV No. 6
| data-sort-value="Fruhlingsgesang" | Frühlingsgesang, D 740
| data-sort-value="text Schmucket die Locken mit duftigen Kranzen 2" | Schmücket die Locken mit duftigen Kränzen
| data-sort-value="1822-04-01" | January–early April1822
| data-sort-value="Text by Schober, Franz von, Schmucket die Locken mit duftigen Kranzen 2" | Text by Schober (other setting, of which the music is partly reused in this setting); For ttbb and piano
|-
| 741
| 741
| data-sort-value="020,1823-1" | 20,1(1823)
| data-sort-value="2006,400" | XX, 6No. 400
| data-sort-value="401,0201" | IV, 1a
| data-sort-value="Sei mir gegrusst" | Sei mir gegrüßt
| data-sort-value="text O du Entriss'ne mir" | O du Entriß'ne mir
| data-sort-value="1822-09-21" | late 1821–autumn 1822
| data-sort-value="Text by Ruckert, Friedrich, O du Entriss'ne mir" | Text by Rückert
|-
| 742
| 742
| data-sort-value="068,1822-0" | 68(1822)
| data-sort-value="2007,401" | XX, 7No. 401
| data-sort-value="403,00" | IV, 3
| data-sort-value="Wachtelschlag, Der" | Der Wachtelschlag
| data-sort-value="text Ach! mir schallt's dorten so lieblich hervor" | Ach! mir schallt's dorten so lieblich hervor
| data-sort-value="1822-07-30" | before30/7/1822
|-
| 743
| 743
| data-sort-value="023,1823-2" | 23,2(1823)
| data-sort-value="2007,406" | XX, 7No. 406
| data-sort-value="402,0232" | IV, 2a
| Selige Welt
| data-sort-value="text Ich treibe auf des Lebens Meer" | Ich treibe auf des Lebens Meer
| data-sort-value="1822-09-21" | autumn1822?
| data-sort-value="Text by Senn, Johann, Ich treibe auf des Lebens Meer" | Text by Senn; For b and piano
|- id="D 744"
| 744
| 744
| data-sort-value="023,1823-3" | 23,3(1823)
| data-sort-value="2007,407" | XX, 7No. 407
| data-sort-value="402,0233" | IV, 2a
| Schwanengesang, D 744
| data-sort-value="text Wie klag' ich's aus das Sterbegefuhl" | Wie klag' ich's aus das Sterbegefühl
| data-sort-value="1822-09-21" | autumn1822?
| data-sort-value="Text by Senn, Johann, Wie klag' ich's aus das Sterbegefuhl" | Text by Senn
|-
| 745
| 745
| data-sort-value="073,1822-0" | 73(1822)(1895)
| data-sort-value="2007,408" | XX, 7No. 408
| data-sort-value="403,00" | IV, 3
| data-sort-value="Rose, Die" | Die Rose
| data-sort-value="text Es lockte schone Warme" | Es lockte schöne Wärme
| data-sort-value="1822-01-01" | 1822
| data-sort-value="Text by Schlegel, Friedrich von from Abendrote I 06" | Text by Schlegel, F., from Abendröte I, 6; Two versions: 1st publ. as Op. 73 in 1827
|-
| 746
| 746
| data-sort-value="XXX,1831" | (1831)
| data-sort-value="2007,422" | XX, 7No. 422
| data-sort-value="413,00" | IV, 13
| Am See, D 746
| data-sort-value="text In des Sees Wogenspiele" | In des Sees Wogenspiele
| data-sort-value="1822-01-01" | 1822 or1823?
| data-sort-value="Text by Bruchmann, Franz von, In des Sees Wogenspiele"| Text by 
|-
| 747
| 747
| data-sort-value="011,1822-3" | 11,3(1822)
| data-sort-value="1600,006" | XVINo. 6
| data-sort-value="303,29" | III, 3 No. 29
| Geist der Liebe, D 747
| data-sort-value="text Der Abend schleiert Flur und Hain 2" | Der Abend schleiert Flur und Hain
| data-sort-value="1822-01-01" | January1822
| data-sort-value="Text by Matthisson, Friedrich von, Der Abend schleiert Flur und Hain 2" | Text by Matthisson; For ttbb and piano
|-
| 748
| 748
| data-sort-value="157,1822-0" | 157p(1822)
| data-sort-value="1700,003" | XVIINo. 3
| data-sort-value="301,00" | III, 1
| Am Geburtstage des Kaisers
| data-sort-value="text Steig empor, umbluht von Segen" | Steig empor, umblüht von Segen
| data-sort-value="1822-01-01" | January1822
|-
| 749
| 749
| data-sort-value="XXX,1850" | (1850)
| data-sort-value="2010,588" | XX, 10No. 588
| data-sort-value="413,00" | IV, 13
| Herrn Josef Spaun, Assessor in Linz
| data-sort-value="text Und nimmer schreibst du?" | Und nimmer schreibst du?
| data-sort-value="1822-01-01" | January1822
| data-sort-value="Text by Collin, Matthaus Casimir von, Und nimmer schreibst du?" | Text by Collin, M. C.
|-
| 750
| 750
| data-sort-value="XXX,1888" | (1888)
| data-sort-value="1400,008" | XIV No. 8
| data-sort-value="109,009" | I, 9No. 9
| Tantum ergo, D 750
| data-sort-value="key D major" | D major
| data-sort-value="1822-22-03" | 22/3/1822
| data-sort-value="Text by Aquinas, Thomas, Tantum ergo 5" | Text by Aquinas (other settings: , 461, 730, 739, 962 and Anh. I/17); For SATB and orchestra
|-
| 751
| 751
| data-sort-value="023,1823-1" | 23,1(1823)
| data-sort-value="2007,410" | XX, 7No. 410
| data-sort-value="402,0231" | IV, 2a
| data-sort-value="Liebe hat gelogen, Die" | Die Liebe hat gelogen
| data-sort-value="text Die Liebe hat gelogen" | Die Liebe hat gelogen
| data-sort-value="1822-04-17" | before17/4/1822
| data-sort-value="Text by Platen, August von, Die Liebe hat gelogen" | Text by Platen
|-
| 752
| 752
| data-sort-value="XXX,1872" | (1872)
| data-sort-value="2007,403" | XX, 7No. 403
| data-sort-value="413,00" | IV, 13
| Nachtviolen
| data-sort-value="text Nachtviolen, Nachtviolen" | Nachtviolen, Nachtviolen
| data-sort-value="1822-04-01" | April 1822
| data-sort-value="Text by Mayrhofer, Johann, Nachtviolen, Nachtviolen" | Text by Mayrhofer
|-
| 753
| 753
| data-sort-value="065,1826-3" | 65,3(1826)
| data-sort-value="2007,404" | XX, 7No. 404
| data-sort-value="403,00" | IV, 3
| Heliopolis I a.k.a. Aus Heliopolis
| data-sort-value="text Im kalten, rauhen Norden" | Im kalten, rauhen Norden
| data-sort-value="1822-04-01" | April 1822
| data-sort-value="Text by Mayrhofer, Johann, Im kalten, rauhen Norden" | Text by Mayrhofer
|-
| 754
| 754
| data-sort-value="XXX,1842" | (1842)
| data-sort-value="2007,405" | XX, 7No. 405
| data-sort-value="413,00" | IV, 13
| Heliopolis II a.k.a. Im Hochgebirge
| data-sort-value="text Fels auf Felsen hingewalzet" | Fels auf Felsen hingewälzet
| data-sort-value="1822-04-01" | April 1822
| data-sort-value="Text by Mayrhofer, Johann, Fels auf Felsen hingewalzet" | Text by Mayrhofer; For b and piano
|-
| 755
| 755
| data-sort-value="ZZZZ" |
| data-sort-value="ZZZZ" |
| data-sort-value="105,A3" | I, 5 Anh.
| data-sort-value="Kyrie, D 755" | Kyrie, D 755
| data-sort-value="key A minor" | A minorKyrie
| data-sort-value="1822-05-01" | May 1822
| data-sort-value="Text: Mass ordinary 12" | Text: Mass ordinary (other settings: , 31, 45, 49, 56, 66, 105, 167, 324, 452, 678 and 950); For satbSATB, strings and organ; Sketch
|-
| 756
| 756
| data-sort-value="059,1826-1" | 59,1(1826)(1895)
| data-sort-value="2007,409" | XX, 7No. 409
| data-sort-value="403,00" | IV, 3
| Du liebst mich nicht
| data-sort-value="text Mein Herz ist zerrissen, du liebst mich nicht!" | Mein Herz ist zerrissen, du liebst mich nicht!
| data-sort-value="1822-07-01" | July 1822
| data-sort-value="Text by Platen, August von, Mein Herz ist zerrissen, du liebst mich nicht!" | Text by Platen; Two versions: 2nd is Op. 59 No. 1
|-
| 757
| 757
| data-sort-value="133,1839-0" | 133p(1839)
| data-sort-value="1800,003" | XVIIINo. 3
| data-sort-value="303,30" | III, 3 No. 30Anh. III No. 4
| Gott in der Natur
| data-sort-value="text Gross ist der Herr!" | Groß ist der Herr!
| data-sort-value="1822-08-01" | August1822
| data-sort-value="Text by Kleist, Ewald Christian von, Gross ist der Herr!" | Text by Kleist; For ssaa and piano
|-
| data-sort-value="999.07571" |
| data-sort-value="757.1" | 757A
| data-sort-value="ZZZZ" |
| data-sort-value="ZZZZ" |
| data-sort-value="724,00" | VII/2, 4
| March, D 757A
| data-sort-value="key B minor" | B minor
| data-sort-value="1822-01-01" | 1822
| For piano
|-
| 758
| 758
| data-sort-value="108,1829-2" | 108,2(1829)
| data-sort-value="2007,411" | XX, 7No. 411
| data-sort-value="405,00" | IV, 5
| Todesmusik
| data-sort-value="text In des Todes Feierstunde" | In des Todes Feierstunde
| data-sort-value="1822-09-01" | September1822
| data-sort-value="Text by Schober, Franz von, In des Todes Feierstunde" | Text by Schober; Two versions: 2nd is Op. 108 No. 2
|-
| 759
| 759
| data-sort-value="XXX,1867" | (1867)
| data-sort-value="0102,008" | I, 2No. 8XXII v1
| data-sort-value="503,07" | V, 3No. 7
| data-sort-value="Symphony No. 08" | Symphony No. 8, a.k.a. Unfinished Symphony
| data-sort-value="key B minor" | B minor
| data-sort-value="1822-10-30" | 30/10/1822
| Allegro moderato – Andante con moto – Scherzo (Fragment);  No. 1 may be its 4th movement
|-
| data-sort-value="732A" | 732(Ov.)
| 759A
| data-sort-value="069,1839-0" | 69(1839)
| data-sort-value="ZZZZ" |
| data-sort-value="724,00" | VII/2, 4
| Overture to Alfonso und Estrella, D 759A
| data-sort-value="key D major" | D major
| data-sort-value="1822-11-01" | November1822
| For piano; Arranged from 
|-
| 760
| 760
| data-sort-value="015,1823-0" | 15(1823)
| data-sort-value="1100,001" | XI No. 1
| data-sort-value="725,01" | VII/2, 5
| Fantasy, D 760, a.k.a. Wanderer Fantasy
| data-sort-value="key C major" | C major
| data-sort-value="1822-11-01" | November1822
| For piano; Reuses music of 
|-
| 761
| 761
| data-sort-value="023,1823-4" | 23,4(1823)(1795)
| data-sort-value="2007,412" | XX, 7No. 412
| data-sort-value="402,0234" | IV, 2a &b No. 1
| data-sort-value="Schatzgrabers Begehr" | Schatzgräbers Begehr
| data-sort-value="text In tiefster Erde ruht ein alt Gesetz" | In tiefster Erde ruht ein alt Gesetz
| data-sort-value="1822-11-01" | November1822
| data-sort-value="Text by Schober, Franz von, In tiefster Erde ruht ein alt Gesetz" | Text by Schober; Two versions: 2nd is Op. 23 No. 4
|-
| 762
| 762
| data-sort-value="XXX,1833" | (1833)
| data-sort-value="2007,413" | XX, 7No. 413
| data-sort-value="413,00" | IV, 13
| data-sort-value="Schwestergruss" | Schwestergruß
| data-sort-value="text Im Mondenschein' wall' ich auf und ab" | Im Mondenschein' wall' ich auf und ab
| data-sort-value="1822-11-01" | November1822
| data-sort-value="Text by Bruchmann, Franz von, Im Mondenschein' wall' ich auf und ab"| Text by 
|-
| 763
| 763
| data-sort-value="146,1842-0" | 146p(1842)
| data-sort-value="1700,011" | XVIINo. 11
| data-sort-value="302,13" | III, 2aNo. 13
| data-sort-value="Tages Weihe, Des" | Des Tages Weihe
| data-sort-value="text Schicksalslenker, blicke nieder" | Schicksalslenker, blicke nieder
| data-sort-value="1822-11-22" | 22/11/1822
| For satb and piano
|-
| 764
| 764
| data-sort-value="092,1828-1" | 92,1(1828)(1895)
| data-sort-value="2007,416" | XX, 7No. 416
| data-sort-value="405,00" | IV, 5
| data-sort-value="Musensohn, Der" | Der Musensohn
| data-sort-value="text Durch Feld und Wald zu schweifen" | Durch Feld und Wald zu schweifen
| data-sort-value="1822-12-01" | early Dec.1822
| data-sort-value="Text by Goethe, Johann Wolfgang von, Durch Feld und Wald zu schweifen" | Text by Goethe; Two versions: 2nd is Op. 92 No. 1
|-
| 765
| 765
| data-sort-value="XXX,1868" | (1868)
| data-sort-value="2007,417" | XX, 7No. 417
| data-sort-value="413,00" | IV, 13
| An die Entfernte
| data-sort-value="text So hab' ich wirklich dich verloren?" | So hab' ich wirklich dich verloren?
| data-sort-value="1822-12-01" | early Dec.1822
| data-sort-value="Text by Goethe, Johann Wolfgang von, So hab' ich wirklich dich verloren?" | Text by Goethe
|-
| 766
| 766
| data-sort-value="XXX,1872" | (1872)
| data-sort-value="2007,418" | XX, 7No. 418
| data-sort-value="413,00" | IV, 13
| Am Flusse, D 766
| data-sort-value="text Verfliesset, vielgeliebte Lieder 2" | Verfließet, vielgeliebte Lieder
| data-sort-value="1822-12-01" | early Dec.1822
| data-sort-value="Text by Goethe, Johann Wolfgang von, Verfliesset vielgeliebte Lieder 2" | Text by Goethe
|-
| 767
| 767
| data-sort-value="056,1826-1" | 56,1(1826)(1895)
| data-sort-value="2007,419" | XX, 7No. 419
| data-sort-value="403,00" | IV, 3
| Willkommen und Abschied
| data-sort-value="text Es schlug mein Herz" | Es schlug mein Herz
| data-sort-value="1822-12-01" | early Dec.1822
| data-sort-value="Text by Goethe, Johann Wolfgang von, Es schlug mein Herz" | Text by Goethe; Two versions: 2nd is Op. 56 No. 1
|}

Lists of compositions by Franz Schubert
Compositions by Franz Schubert
Schubert